is a 2014 Japanese high school horror film directed by Eisuke Naito and based on the novel by Yusuke Yamada. It was released on March 8, 2014.

Cast
Kaho as Azusa Nakamura 
Shuhei Nomura as Shigeo Yuasa 
Kazuya Takahashi
Saori Yagi
Kokone Sasaki
Ryuzo Tanaka
Baku Owada

References

External links
 

Japanese horror films
2014 horror films
Films based on Japanese novels
Japanese high school films
2010s high school films
2010s Japanese films